Eksta is a populated area, a socken (not to be confused with parish), on the Swedish island of Gotland. It comprises the same area as the administrative Eksta District, established on 1January 2016.

Geography 
Eksta is situated on the southwest coast of Gotland. The medieval Eksta Church is located in the socken. The two islands Stora Karlsö and Lilla Karlsö just off the coast of Gotland are also part of Eksta.

, Eksta Church belongs to Eksta parish in Klinte pastorat.

History 
The remains of a Pitted Ware culture settlement along with 85 graves from that Middle Neolithic period, have been found at Ajvide in Eksta. The settlement has been excavated and is known as the Ajvide Settlement,. Ajvide is also known for its beach meadow, Ajvide strandänge, one of only two on Gotland that are still used for harvesting hay.

References

External links 

Objects from Eksta at the Digital Museum by Nordic Museum

Populated places in Gotland County